Admiral Graf Spee was a  "Panzerschiff" (armored ship), nicknamed a "pocket battleship" by the British, which served with the Kriegsmarine of Nazi Germany during World War II. The vessel was named after World War I Admiral Maximilian von Spee, commander of the East Asia Squadron who fought the battles of Coronel and the Falkland Islands, where he was killed in action. She was laid down at the Reichsmarinewerft shipyard in Wilhelmshaven in October 1932 and completed by January 1936. Armed with six  guns in two triple gun turrets, Admiral Graf Spee and her sisters were designed to outgun any cruiser fast enough to catch them. Their top speed of  left only the few battlecruisers in the Anglo-French navies fast enough and powerful enough to sink them.

The ship conducted five non-intervention patrols during the Spanish Civil War in 1936–1938 and participated in the Coronation Review of King George VI in May 1937. Admiral Graf Spee was deployed to the South Atlantic in the weeks before the outbreak of World War II, to be positioned in merchant sea lanes once war was declared. Between September and December 1939, the warship sank nine vessels totaling , before being confronted by three British cruisers at the Battle of the River Plate on 13 December. Admiral Graf Spee inflicted heavy damage on the British ships, but she too was damaged and was forced to put into port at Montevideo, Uruguay. Convinced by false reports of superior British naval forces gathering, Hans Langsdorff, commander of the ship, ordered the vessel to be scuttled. The ship was partially broken up in situ, though part of the ship remained visible above the surface of the water.

Design

Admiral Graf Spee was powered by four sets of MAN 9-cylinder double-acting two-stroke diesel engines. As designed, her standard complement consisted of 33 officers and 586 enlisted men, though after 1935 this was significantly increased to 30 officers and 921–1,040 sailors. The ship was equipped one catapult but had no aircraft hangar. One floatplane was carried on the catapult. The initial Heinkel He 60 was replaced with an Arado Ar 196 before the outbreak of the war. Admiral Graf Spee was the first German warship to be equipped with radar. A  FMG G(gO) "Seetakt" set  was mounted on the foretop range finder.

Admiral Graf Spees primary armament was six  SK C/28 guns mounted in two triple gun turrets, one forward and one aft of the superstructure. The ship carried a secondary battery of eight  SK C/28 guns in single turrets grouped amidships. Her anti-aircraft battery originally consisted of three  L/45 guns, though in 1935 these were replaced with six  L/78 guns. In 1938, the 8.8 cm guns were removed, and six  L/65 guns, four  SK C/30 guns, and ten  C/30 guns were installed in their place. The ship also carried a pair of quadruple  deck-mounted torpedo tubes placed on her stern.

Service history

Admiral Graf Spee was ordered by the Reichsmarine from the Reichsmarinewerft shipyard in Wilhelmshaven. Ordered as Ersatz Braunschweig, Admiral Graf Spee replaced the old pre-dreadnought battleship . Her keel was laid on 1 October 1932, under construction number 125. The ship was launched on 30 June 1934; at her launching, she was christened by the daughter of Admiral Maximilian von Spee, the ship's namesake. She was completed slightly over a year and a half later on 6 January 1936, the day she was commissioned into the German fleet.

Admiral Graf Spee spent the first three months of her career conducting extensive sea trials to ready the ship for service. The ship's first commander was Kapitän zur See (KzS) Conrad Patzig; he was replaced in 1937 by KzS Walter Warzecha. After joining the fleet, Admiral Graf Spee became the flagship of the German Navy. In the summer of 1936, following the outbreak of the Spanish Civil War, she deployed to the Atlantic to participate in non-intervention patrols off the Republican-held coast of Spain. Between August 1936 and May 1937, the ship conducted three patrols off Spain. On the return voyage from Spain, Admiral Graf Spee stopped in Great Britain to represent Germany in the Coronation Review at Spithead for King George VI on 20 May.

After the conclusion of the Review, Admiral Graf Spee returned to Spain for a fourth non-intervention patrol. Following fleet maneuvers and a brief visit to Sweden, the ship conducted a fifth and final patrol in February 1938. In 1938, KzS Hans Langsdorff took command of the vessel; she conducted a series of goodwill visits to various foreign ports throughout the year. These included cruises into the Atlantic, where she stopped in Tangier and Vigo. She also participated in extensive fleet maneuvers in German waters. She was part of the celebrations for the reintegration of the port of Memel into Germany, and a fleet review in honor of Admiral Miklós Horthy, the Regent of Hungary. Between 18 April and 17 May 1939, she conducted another cruise into the Atlantic, stopping in the ports of Ceuta and Lisbon. On 21 August 1939, Admiral Graf Spee departed Wilhelmshaven, bound for the South Atlantic.

World War II 

Following the outbreak of war between Germany and the Allies in September 1939, Adolf Hitler ordered the German Navy to begin commerce raiding against Allied merchant traffic. Hitler nevertheless delayed issuing the order until it became clear that Britain would not countenance a peace treaty following the conquest of Poland. The Admiral Graf Spee was instructed to strictly adhere to prize rules, which required raiders to stop and search ships for contraband before sinking them, and to ensure that their crews are safely evacuated. Langsdorff was ordered to avoid combat, even with inferior opponents, and to frequently change position. While replenishing his fuel supplies, Langsdorff ordered superfluous equipment transferred to the Altmark; this included several of the ship's boats, flammable paint, and two of her ten 2 cm anti-aircraft guns, which were installed on the tanker.

On 11 September, while still transferring supplies from Altmark, Admiral Graf Spees Arado floatplane spotted the British heavy cruiser  approaching the two German ships. Langsdorff ordered both vessels to depart at high speed, successfully evading the British cruiser. On 26 September, the ship finally received orders authorizing attacks on Allied merchant shipping. The cargo ship transmitted an "RRR" signal ("I am under attack by a raider") before the cruiser ordered her to stop. Admiral Graf Spee took Clements captain and chief engineer prisoner but left the rest of her crew to abandon ship in the lifeboats. The cruiser then fired 30 rounds from her 28 cm and 15 cm guns and two torpedoes at the cargo ship, which broke up and sank. Langsdorff ordered a distress signal sent to the naval station in Pernambuco to ensure the rescue of the ship's crew. The British Admiralty immediately issued a warning to merchant shipping that a German surface raider was in the area. The British crew later reached the Brazilian coast in their lifeboats.

On 5 October, the British and French navies formed eight groups to hunt down Admiral Graf Spee in the South Atlantic.

On the same day as the formation of the Anglo-French hunter groups, Admiral Graf Spee captured the steamer Newton Beech. Two days later, she encountered and sank the merchant ship Ashlea. On 8 October, the following day, she sank Newton Beech, which Langsdorff had been using to house prisoners. Newton Beech was too slow to keep up with Admiral Graf Spee, and so the prisoners were transferred to the cruiser. On 10 October, she captured the steamer Huntsman, the captain of which had not sent a distress signal until the last minute, as he had mistakenly identified Admiral Graf Spee as a French warship. Unable to accommodate the crew from Huntsman, Admiral Graf Spee sent the ship to a rendezvous location with a prize crew. On 15 October, Admiral Graf Spee rendezvoused with Altmark to refuel and transfer prisoners; the following morning, the prize Huntsman joined the two ships. The prisoners aboard Huntsman were transferred to Altmark and Langsdorff then sank Huntsman on the night of 17 October.

On 22 October, Admiral Graf Spee encountered and sank the steamer Trevanion. At the end of October, Langsdorff sailed his ship into the Indian Ocean south of Madagascar. The purpose of that foray was to divert Allied warships away from the South Atlantic, and to confuse the Allies about his intentions. By this time, Admiral Graf Spee had cruised for almost  and needed an engine overhaul. On 15 November, the ship sank the tanker , and the following day, she stopped an unidentified Dutch steamer, though did not sink her. Admiral Graf Spee returned to the Atlantic between 17 and 26 November to refuel from Altmark. While replenishing supplies, the crew of Admiral Graf Spee built a dummy gun turret on her bridge and erected a dummy second funnel behind the aircraft catapult to alter her silhouette significantly in a bid to confuse allied shipping as to her true identity.

Admiral Graf Spees Arado floatplane located the merchant ship : Langsdorff fired a shot across her bow to stop the ship. Doric Star was able to send out a distress signal before she was sunk, which prompted Harwood to take his three cruisers to the mouth of the River Plate, which he suspected might be Langsdorff's next target. On 3 December, Admiral Graf Spee sank the steamer . On 6 December, she met with Altmark and transferred 140 prisoners from Doric Star and Tairoa. Admiral Graf Spee encountered her last victim on the evening of 7 December: the freighter Streonshalh. The prize crew recovered secret documents containing shipping route information. Based on that information, Langsdorff decided to head for the seas off Montevideo. On 12 December, the ship's Arado 196 broke down and could not be repaired, depriving Graf Spee of her aerial reconnaissance. The ship's disguise was removed, so it would not hinder the ship in battle.

Battle of the River Plate 

At 05:30 on the morning of 13 December 1939, lookouts spotted a pair of masts off the ship's starboard bow. Langsdorff assumed this to be the escort for a convoy mentioned in the documents recovered from Tairoa. Langsdorff decided not to flee from the British ships, and ordered his ship to battle stations and to close at maximum speed. At 06:08, the British spotted Admiral Graf Spee; Harwood divided his ships to split the gunfire of Admiral Graf Spees 28 cm guns. The German ship opened fire with her main battery at Exeter and her secondary guns at the flagship  at 06:17. At 06:20, Exeter returned fire, followed by Ajax at 06:21 and Achillies at 06:24. In the span of thirty minutes, Admiral Graf Spee had hit Exeter three times, disabling her two forward turrets, destroying her bridge and her aircraft catapult, and starting major fires. Ajax and Achilles moved closer to Admiral Graf Spee to relieve the pressure on Exeter.

Langsdorff thought the two light cruisers were making a torpedo attack, and turned away under a smokescreen. The respite allowed Exeter to withdraw from the action; by now, only one of her gun turrets was still in action, and she had suffered 61 dead and 23 wounded crew members. At around 07:00, Exeter returned to the engagement, firing from her stern turret. Admiral Graf Spee fired on her again, scored more hits, and forced Exeter to withdraw again, this time with a list to port. At 07:25, Admiral Graf Spee scored a hit on Ajax that disabled her aft turrets. Both sides broke off the action, Admiral Graf Spee retreating into the River Plate estuary, while Harwood's battered cruisers remained outside to observe any possible breakout attempts. In the course of the engagement, Admiral Graf Spee had been hit approximately 70 times; 36 men were killed and 60 more were wounded, including Langsdorff, who had been wounded twice by splinters while standing on the open bridge.

Scuttling 

As a result of battle damage and casualties, Langsdorff decided to put into Montevideo, where repairs could be effected and the wounded men could be evacuated from the ship. Most of the hits scored by the British cruisers caused only minor structural and superficial damage, but the oil purification plant, which was required to prepare the diesel fuel for the engines, was destroyed. Her desalination plant and galley were also destroyed, which would have increased the difficulty of a return to Germany. A hit in the bow would also have negatively affected her seaworthiness in the heavy seas of the North Atlantic. Admiral Graf Spee had fired much of her ammunition in the engagement with Harwood's cruisers.

After arriving in port, the wounded crewmen were taken to local hospitals and the dead were buried with full military honors. Captive Allied seamen, consisting of 6 captains, 9 chief engineers, 25 officers, and 21 seamen still aboard the ship, were released. Repairs necessary to make the ship seaworthy were expected to take up to two weeks. British naval intelligence worked to convince Langsdorff that vastly superior forces were concentrating to destroy his ship, if he attempted to break out of the harbor. The Admiralty broadcast a series of signals, on frequencies known to be intercepted by German intelligence. Believing the British reports, Langsdorff discussed his options with commanders in Berlin. These were either to break out and seek refuge in Buenos Aires, where the Argentine government would intern the ship, or to scuttle the ship in the Plate estuary.

Langsdorff was unwilling to risk the lives of his crew, so he decided to scuttle the ship. He knew that although Uruguay was neutral, the government was on friendly terms with Britain and if he allowed his ship to be interned, the Uruguayan Navy would allow British intelligence officers access to the ship. Under Article 17 of the Hague Convention of 1907, neutrality restrictions limited Admiral Graf Spee to a period of 72 hours for repairs in Montevideo, before she would be interned for the duration of the war. On 17 December 1939, Langsdorff ordered the destruction of all important equipment aboard the ship. The ship's remaining ammunition supply was dispersed throughout the ship, in preparation for scuttling. On 17 December, the ship, with only Langsdorff and 40 other men aboard, moved into the outer roadstead to be scuttled. A crowd of 20,000 watched as the scuttling charges were set; the crew was taken off by an Argentine tug and the ship was scuttled at 20:55. The multiple explosions from the munitions sent jets of flame high into the air and created a large cloud of smoke that obscured the ship which burned in the shallow water for the next two days.

On 20 December, in his room in a Buenos Aires hotel, Langsdorff shot himself in full dress uniform while lying on the ship's battle ensign. In late January 1940, the neutral American cruiser  arrived in Montevideo and the crew was permitted to visit the wreck of Admiral Graf Spee. The Americans met the German crewmen, who were still in Montevideo. In the aftermath of the scuttling, the ship's crew were taken to Argentina, where they were interned for the remainder of the war.

Wreck 

The wreck was partially broken up in situ in 1942–1943, though parts of the ship were visible for some time after; the wreck lies at a depth of only . The salvage rights were purchased from the German Government by a Montevideo engineering company for £14,000, a front for the British. The British had been surprised by the accuracy of the gunnery and expected to find a radar range finder, which they did. They used the knowledge thus acquired to try to develop countermeasures, under the leadership of Fred Hoyle at the British radar project. The Admiralty complained about the large sum paid for the salvage rights.

In February 2004, a salvage team began work raising the wreck of Admiral Graf Spee. The operation was in part being funded by the government of Uruguay, in part by the private sector as the wreck was a hazard to navigation. The first major section—a  gunnery rangefinding telemeter—was raised on 25 February.

On 2 January 2022, a newspaper in Punta del Este reported that an Argentine Jewish businessman, Daniel Sielecki, had offered to buy the eagle and swastika crest from the Admiral Graf Spee from the naval warehouse. Sielecki said he wanted to explode the crest into “a thousand pieces" in order to keep it out of the hands of neo-Nazis.

Footnotes

Notes

Citations

See also

 The Battle of the River Plate (film) (titled in the United States as Pursuit of the Graf Spee) is a 1956 British war film about the battle

References

Further reading

External links
 Contemporary newsreel of the sinking

1934 ships
1939 in Uruguay
Battle of the River Plate
Deutschland-class cruisers
Maritime incidents in December 1939
Military units and formations of Nazi Germany in the Spanish Civil War
Scuttled vessels of Germany
Ships built in Wilhelmshaven
Shipwrecks in rivers
World War II cruisers of Germany
World War II shipwrecks in the Atlantic Ocean
World War II shipwrecks in the South Atlantic